The 1829 State of the Union Address was given by Andrew Jackson, the seventh president of the United States.  He did not speak directly to the 21st United States Congress, but it was still important. Presented on Tuesday, December 8, 1829, in the United States House of Representatives chamber, it was his first address. He said, "In communicating with you for the first time it is to me a source of unfeigned satisfaction, calling for mutual gratulation and devout thanks to a benign Providence, that we are at peace with all man-kind, and that our country exhibits the most cheering evidence of general welfare and progressive improvement." He addressed the Natives, There the benevolent may endeavor to teach them the arts of civilization, and, by promoting union and harmony among them, to raise up an interesting commonwealth, destined to perpetuate the race and to attest the humanity and justice of this Government."

References

State of the Union addresses
Presidency of Andrew Jackson
21st United States Congress
1829 documents
State of the Union Address
State of the Union Address
State of the Union Address
December 1829 events
State of the Union